Rafael Rodríguez Mercado is a Puerto Rican neurosurgeon and military officer. He was the Secretary of Health of Puerto Rico from 2017 until his resignation in 2020. Rodríguez Mercado previously served as chancellor of the University of Puerto Rico, Medical Sciences Campus.

Early life and education 
Rodríguez Mercado was born in Ponce, Puerto Rico. He graduated from High School at Colegio San Conrado. Rodríguez Mercado earned a Bachelor of Science degree in chemistry from the Rio Piedras Campus of the University of Puerto Rico, and a Doctor of Medicine from the University of Puerto Rico School of Medicine, and completing a Residency in Neurological Surgery. He completed studies in Endovascular Neurosurgery at the State University of New York at Buffalo.

Academic career 

Rodríguez Mercado was the first to practice Endovascular Neurosurgery in Puerto Rico since 1997. Currently (2018) he is Professor of Neurosurgery at the University of Puerto Rico School of Medicine and director of the Endovascular Neurosurgery Program of that institution. He also leads the same program at ASEM Stroke Medical Center and, since 2001, is the director of the Fellows Training Program in Neuroendovascular Surgery at the University of Puerto Rico School of Medicine. There, he has trained physicians from many countries in this specialty as well had lecture conferences in many countries and published papers in peer review journals.

Rodríguez Mercado is a member of 15 international medical societies and has participated in several scientific research projects.  Currently (2018) he is licensed to practice medicine in New York, Texas, Florida, Pennsylvania, and Puerto Rico.

In 2010, after a year as Interim Chancellor at the University of Puerto Rico, Medical Sciences Campus, he was named Chancellor of the Medical Sciences Campus of The University of Puerto Rico. In January 2017, Ricardo Rosselló, Governor of Puerto Rico, appointed Rodríguez Mercado as Secretary of Health of Puerto Rico. In September 2017, he was appointed as Associate Professor of Surgery initially and them promoted in February 2019 to Adjunct Professor of Surgery at the Uniformed Services University of Health Sciences. In April 2019, was appointed Professor of Surgery at Ponce Health Sciences University as part of his academic and military career.

Rodríguez Mercado is a Fellow of the American College of Surgeons and a Diplomate of the American Board of Neurological Surgeons.

Military career 
Rodríguez Mercado began his military career in 1988. He served in the United States Army Reserve, Medical Corps, as Command Surgeon in the 1st Mission Support Command at Fort Buchanan, Puerto Rico. He served in Puerto Rico National Guard as Assistant Surgeon and Field Surgeon at Camp Santiago. He was from 2000 to 2006 also a staff neurosurgeon at Walter Reed Army Medical Center and Brooke Army Medical Center. He was Commander of the 369th Army Reserve Hospital Surgical Unit. Currently (2017), he was Associate Professor of Surgery and promoted in February 2019 to Adjunct Professor of Surgery at the Uniformed Services University of the Health Sciences at Bethesda, Maryland on an IMA position. In 2022 he received the Legion of Merit medal.

Military decorations

Secretary of Health of Puerto Rico 
On 12 January 2017, he was appointed as 22nd Secretary of Health of Puerto Rico by Governor Ricardo Rosselló. His tenure as Health Secretary was marred with criticism over the Health Department's handling of mayor emergencies which affected Puerto Rico such as Hurricane Irma, Hurricane Maria, the 2020 earthquakes and the agency's botched handling of the COVID-19 outbreak as well as questionable Health Department contracts given to people associated with the governor's political campaign.

COVID-19 Outbreak Response 
As COVID-19 cases were increasing in other states and countries, Rodríguez Mercado seemingly downplayed the urgency of the situation stating that the probability of a COVID-19 outbreak in Puerto Rico was unlikely. As suspected COVID-19 cases on the island grew, the agency resisted performing tests and sending them to the Centers for Disease Control and Prevention by setting a high bar on whom the tests should be performed. In one particular instance, an island doctor managed to convince the agency to test a patient only after pleading with CBS reporter David Begnaud , after the Health agency denied requests to test his patient.

Resignation 
On March 13, 2020, under public pressure and at the behest of governor Wanda Vázquez Garced, he immediately resigned to the position of Secretary of Health. His resignation came after the confirmation of several cases of COVID-19 on the island which included the case the agency had initially resisted on testing, as well as findings that the test samples were sent later than had been publicly announced, and that there had been documentation errors that caused subsequent delays in reporting. He was succeeded by interim secretary Concepción Quiñones de Longo.

Personal life 
Rodríguez Mercado is married to medical technologist, Wanda Santiago Pimentel. He has one son.

References

External links 

 1st MSC Command Surgeon nominated as Secretary of Health for Puerto Ri
 Rafael Rodriguez-Mercado, MD, FAANS, FACS - University of Puerto Rico Medical Sciences Campus - Professor Neurosurgery
 Panelists share global engagement successes at home and abroad .
 Rafael Rodriguez-Mercado.

1961 births
Living people
Members of the 17th Cabinet of Puerto Rico
Military personnel from Ponce
Puerto Rican military officers
Physicians from Ponce
Secretaries of Health of Puerto Rico
Recipients of the Legion of Merit
Recipients of the Meritorious Service Medal (United States)
United States Army reservists
University at Buffalo alumni
University of Puerto Rico School of Medicine alumni
University of Puerto Rico faculty
American neurosurgeons
20th-century American physicians
21st-century American physicians
United States Army Medical Corps officers
20th-century surgeons